The Worrorra, also written Worora, are an Aboriginal Australian people of the Kimberley area of north-western Australia.

The term is sometimes used to describe speakers of the (Western) Worrorra language, and sometimes groups whose traditional languages are one of the whole group of Worrorran languages. A native title claim in which the people referred to themselves as the Dambimangari people was lodged in 1998 and determined in 2011. The word is said to be derived from Dambina (a name for the Worrorra) and Ngardi peoples. More recently, it has been spelt Dambeemangarddee.

The Worrorra, Wunambal and Ngarinyin peoples make up a cultural bloc known Wanjina Wunggurr, in which the Ngardi are sometimes also included.

Country
Seawards it includes Heywood and Augustus Islands. On their southern boundaries lay the lands of the Umida and Unggumi people; to their east the Ngarinyin, and northwards, west of the Princess May Range, the Wunambal. 

The zone is consistently affected by tropical heat, with three seasons defined by the Worrorra: aajaajirri, the monsoonal season running from mid-December through to April; mawingki, in June-July, with a slight night-time cooling of temperatures, and then mirringunu, the torrid months from October to mid-December. The landscape is hilly sandstone terrain, quilted with spinifex and loose stands of bloodwood eucalypts, woollybutts and boabs.

Wanjina Wungurr cultural bloc
The Worrorra, Wunambal, and Ngarinyin peoples form a cultural bloc known Wanjina Wunggurr. The shared culture is based on the dreamtime mythology and law whose creators are the Wanjina and Wunggurr spirits, ancestors of these peoples.

Rock paintings depicting Wanjina, as well as the Gwion Gwion ("Bradshaw") paintings, are evidence of the shared culture.

Wunggurr is a variant on the Rainbow Serpent creator being belief, while the wandjina are local spirits, attached to places, and associated with particular clans. Although some local expressions use the two terms interchangeably, wungurr is a "more diffuse life force animating and underlying the particular manifestations of its power that find expression in all species of things, including the wandjina". One facet of wungurr is embodied in a rock python (Stimson's python?), known as Wanjad.

The Ngardi people have also been grouped with the other Wanjina Wungurr peoples, with a close link to the Worrorran (Dambina) people, sometimes referred to as Dambina-Ngardi or Dambimangari.

According to Mark Clendon, the grouping

Native title claim
As part of a native title claim lodged in 1998 by Wanjina Wunggurr RNTBC known as the Dambimangari claim, which included claims for the three peoples in the Wanjina Wunggurr cultural bloc (the Worrorra/Dambimangari, Wunambal Gaambera/Uunguu and Ngarinyin/Wilinggin), Worrorra people lodged a claim in the National Native Title Tribunal over a large area of land, which was determined on 26 May 2011. It includes sea, coastal lands and hinterland, including Worrorra traditional lands between Prince Regent River to the north and Robinson River to the south, as well as including some of the Prince Regent National Park. Much of the area is under exclusive possession.

The Dambimangari Aboriginal Corporation manages the Dambimangari people's business affairs, while the Wanjina Wunggurr RNTBC acts on behalf of the Worrora/Dambimangari, Ngarinyin (Wilinggin) and Wunambal Gaambera (Uunguu) native title holders with regard to their rights and interests.

Marine parks
The Dambimangari ( spelt Dambeemangarddee)  Aboriginal Corporation co-manages the Lalang-garram / Horizontal Falls Marine Park. In 2016 it was planned that this park, together with the Lalang-garram / Camden Sound Marine Park, North Lalang-garram Marine Park (the northern extent of Dambimangari saltwater country) and the North Kimberley Marine Park (in Uunguu waters) would make up the new Great Kimberley Marine Park, with the Government of Western Australia's Department of Parks and Wildlife (now Department of Biodiversity, Conservation and Attractions). Several sacred sites fall within these areas.

In 2020, a new management plan was released, titled Lalang-gaddam Marine Park: Amended joint management plan for the Lalang-garram / Camden Sound, Lalang-garram / Horizontal Falls and North Lalang-garram marine parks and indicative joint management plan for the proposed Maiyalam Marine Park. It was published ahead of the gazettal of the proposed Maiyalam Marine Park under the Conservation and Land Management Act 1984 (the "CALM Act"): as a Class A reserve. Under the new arrangements, the zoning would not change, but the plan is now to amalgamate four marine parks (Lalang-garram / Camden Sound, Lalang-garram / Horizontal Falls, North Lalang-garram Marine Park and the new Maiyalam Marine Park) to form the Lalang-gaddam Marine Park, all in the sea country of the Dambeemangarddee people. This plan will be amended by another 10-year final joint management plan.

The new Maiyalam Marine Park will create add  to the Kimberley marine reserves. The new spelling, "Lalang-gaddam", reflects the correct pronunciation of the word, and "Maiyalam" means "between islands", or "a gap through". The new Maiyalam Marine Park covers an area off the north-western coast of King Sound and around Macleay Island.

The new Lalang-gaddam Marine Park borders the proposed Mayala Marine Park to the south-west (covering the Buccaneer Archipelago, traditional land and waters of the Mayala peoples), and the North Kimberley Marine Park (Uunguu waters) to the north-east. The land and sea border to the south abut Bardi Jawi land and a proposed Bardi Jawi Marine Park. Maps show the extent of the various marine parks, native title determinations, zones within the areas, etc.

Details such as port areas are outlined in the plan. An Indigenous land use agreement (ILUA) already covers the Lalang-garram/ Camden Sound, Lalang-garram/ Horizontal Falls and North Lalang-garram marine parks, but an additional ILUA will be needed to allow the creation of the proposed Maiyalam Marine Park in accordance with the Native Title Act 1993. Much of Collier Bay will remain a general use zone, but the Walcott Inlet will be zoned as sanctuary.

IPA
An Indigenous Protected Area was declared in 2013 over an area covering  from north of Derby stretching eastwards to the Prince Regent area. It is managed by the Dambimangari Rangers, a team of Indigenous rangers.

History since first European contact
As early as 1838, the explorer George Grey had described three rock paintings in Worrorra territory. On either side were two more, which he was unable to determine what they represented. Grey made a copy which he printed in his book. Many wild speculations arose concerning their origin, Arthur Capell linking them to the diffusion of megalithic cults and ultimately to chambered tombs in Europe and Egypt. These were later identified however as Wandjina figures in Worrorra mythology.

From around 1912 the Worrorra people came into contact with increasing numbers of European settlers.

In 1927 James Robert Beattie Love, a Presbyterian minister, was appointed to head the Presbyterian Mission to the Aborigines which had been established at Kunmunya, known then as Port George IV, in 1912. Love had already been familiar with the area, which he visited in 1914, and had briefly taken charge of pastoral work there.

The Worrorra left their traditional territory in 1956, settling in Mowanjum and later also Derby, with a few resident at Mount Barnett station and Kalumburu. One effect of the transfer was to endanger their indigenous culture as it was conserved in their distinctive language, since they came to adopt either Since 1956 Worrorra people have lived at Mowanjum in close daily contact with people who spoke either
Ungarinyin or Wunambal as their mother tongue. Later this was replaced by Kriol.

Language

By the time intense contact with white settlers began, around 1912, the Worrorra people who still spoke their native tongue fluently were estimated to be around 300, with perhaps triple that figure if those in surrounding districts who spoke it as a second language are included.

The Worrorra language (also known as Western Worrorran, being one of three main groups of the family of Worrorran languages) is now considered to be on the verge of extinction.
Only seven speakers were recorded in the 2016 Australian census.

The British-born Australian linguist Robert M. W. Dixon's career in Australian Aboriginal languages was first stimulated by his being informed by his tutor Michael Halliday of the extraordinary complexity of the indigenous languages spoken in the Kimberley region, and, on reading up on the topic, was particularly fascinated by descriptions of the intricacies of Worrorra which reportedly had 444 forms of the verb "to be". Though the Worrorra have not as highly developed a system of gestural language as many of their tribal neighbours, they do have a rich repertoire of manual signs to indicate a great many species of fauna, to the point of distinguishing the sex of the animal or bird alluded to.

Notable people
 Daisy Utemorrah (1922–1993), Wunambal elder, poet and writer, was fluent in Wunambal, Ngarinyin, and Worrorra, and gained international fame with her books recounting the traditional stories of her people.
 Vinka Barunga, who grew up in Mowanjum and Derby, graduated from the University of Western Australia with an MBBS in 2016, and is the first Worrora doctor and the first Aboriginal doctor in Derby.

Alternative names
 Maialnga (unconfirmed northern horde name)
 Worora, Wo'rora
 Wurara, Worara (pronounced thus by the Ngarinjin)

Source

Notes

Citations

Sources

 Text has been copied from this source, which is available under a Attribution 4.0 International (CC BY 4.0) licence.

Aboriginal peoples of Western Australia
Kimberley (Western Australia)